Peter Charles Knudson is an American politician. A Republican, he is a member of the Utah State Senate, representing the state's 17th senate district in Box Elder, Cache and Tooele Counties including Brigham City.

Early life, education, and career

Peter Knudson started his career in the military. He was a Colonel in the United States Army Reserve. Knudson has an A.S. from Weber State University, his B.S. from Utah State University, his D.D.S. from University of the Pacific's Arthur A. Dugoni School of Dentistry, his M.S. from Loyola University and a Certificate of Specialty in Orthodontics, School of Dentistry, Orthodontics, Loyola University. Knudson met his wife, Georgie, in their senior year at the University of Utah. She was engaged to someone else, and he was going steady. After they had terminated their previous relationships, friends introduced them again and they began seeing each other. Georgie attended Stanford University after finishing at the University of Utah while Knudson attended dental school at the College of Physicians and Surgeons in San Francisco. By the end of their first quarter, they were engaged and they were married at the end of the school year in 1963. They have four children.

Peter Knudsen works as an orthodontics specialist at the University of Utah at the Greenwood clinic.

Background and affiliations
Brigham City Mayor ('78–90)
Brigam City Council ('74–78)
State Job Training Coord. Council (Chair '92–94)

Knudson worked as an orthodontist for many years. Throughout his career, he won many awards including the Distinguished Service Award from the Utah Dental Association. He also served on a number of dentistry and orthodontic boards, including the following: 
Diplomat, American Board of Orthodontics
Fellow International College of Dentists
Fellow American College of Dentists, Utah Association of Orthodontists (past president)
Rocky Mountain Association of Orthodontists
American Association of Orthodontists
American Dental Association
College of Diplomats of the American Board of Orthodontists
Pierre Fauchard Academy
Utah Dental Association

Political career
Knudson started his political career on the Brigham City Council from 1974 to 1978. He then served as the 36th Mayor of Brigham City from 1978 to 1990. He was elected to the House of Representatives and served there from January 1, 1995, to December 31, 1998. He was elected to the Senate in 1998. Throughout his political career he also served on the Utah League of Cities and Towns as president and the National League of Cities on the Board of Directors and advisory council. The Utah League of Cities and Council named Knudson the Most Outstanding Elected Public Official. Peter Knudson won reelection in 2014 against two challengers, one Democrat, and one member of the Constitution Party. He won 75% of the vote. In 2016, Knudson served as the Assistant Majority Whip. In 2016 he was also on the following committees: 
Executive Appropriations Committee
Infrastructure and General Government Appropriations Subcommittee
Natural Resources, Agriculture, and Environmental Quality Appropriations Subcommittee
Senate Economic Development and Workforce Services Committee
Senate Ethics Committee (Chair)
Senate Natural Resources, Agriculture, and Environment Committee
Senate Rules Committee
Senate Health and Human Services Committee

Election

2014

Legislation

2016 sponsored bills

Notable legislation  
As Knudson is a former military man himself, he has been the primary and floor sponsor to many bills which help veterans. In 2014, Knudson floor sponsored  House Bill 275, which officially designates March 29 as Vietnam War Memorial Day. During the 2016 legislative session Senator Knudson passed a veteran's license plate bill that allows veterans to display a license plate indicating which campaign or theater the veteran served in.

References 

1937 births
Living people
Republican Party Utah state senators
Latter Day Saints from Utah
University of the Pacific (United States) alumni
Utah State University alumni
Loyola University Chicago alumni
21st-century American politicians